Tingole is a town and seat of the commune of Binko in the Cercle of Dioila in the Koulikoro Region of south-western Mali.

Populated places in Koulikoro Region